The Royal Worcester fruit painters were a group of painters who specialized in depicting fruits on porcelain tableware. The tradition originated with the painter Octar H. Copson, who in 1880 had also painted a plaque commissioned by a local farmer to commemorate the introduction of the Pershore plum.

Royal Worcester fruit pieces remain highly desirable and have been auctioned for more than $10,000.

List of Worcester fruit painters 

 Harry Austin
 Walter Austin
 William Bagnall
 William Bee
 Octar Copson (1872–1880) (possibly returned in the late 1880s)
 John Freeman
 William Hawkins (1874–1928)
 George Johnson (1875–1914)
 Brian Leaman
 Horace Price
 William Ricketts
 Frank Roberts (1872–1920)
 John Stinton
 William Peter Rowley

External links and References 
 Antique marks
 Worcester Porcelain Museum
 Royal Worcester artists

British artist groups and collectives
19th-century art groups
19th century in the arts